Dicentra nevadensis, the Sierra bleeding heart or Tulare County bleeding heart, is a perennial plant endemic to gravelly outcroppings in the Sierra Nevada peaks of Tulare and Fresno Counties in California.

It has previously been treated as a subspecies of Dicentra formosa (Pacific bleeding heart).

Description
Dicentra nevadensis leaves are finely divided and sprout from the base of the plant.

Flowers are heart-shaped, dull white, pink, or yellow-brown, hanging in racemes on bare stems above the leaves. When dried, the flowers turn black. Flowers bloom June to August.

Seeds are borne in a capsule one to two centimeters long.

References

nevadensis
Endemic flora of California
Flora of the Sierra Nevada (United States)
Alpine flora
Flora without expected TNC conservation status